Harry W. Archer Jr. was an American politician from Maryland. He served as a member of the Maryland House of Delegates, representing Harford County from 1888 to 1890.

Biography
Archer was a Democrat. He served as a member of the Maryland House of Delegates, representing Harford County from 1888 to 1890.

References

Year of birth missing
Year of death missing
People from Harford County, Maryland
Democratic Party members of the Maryland House of Delegates
19th-century American politicians